Polish Socialist Party – Freedom, Equality, Independence (PPS-WRN) was an underground political party in occupied Poland during World War II continuing the traditions of Polish Socialist Party.

PPS-WRN was formed soon after the official freeze of PPS activities in September 1939. At the end of World War II, the name PPS was contested by PPS-WRN and the pro-communist Workers Polish Socialist Party (Robotnicza Partia Polskich Socjalistów). Eventually in 1947, most top PPS-WRN activists were arrested by Polish secret police, Urząd Bezpieczeństwa; the remains ceased political activity, emigrated or joined the communist party.

Its military formations included Gwardia Ludowa WRN and the Workers' Militia PPS-WRN.

See also
Polish Underground State
Polish resistance in World War II

1939 establishments in Poland
1947 disestablishments in Poland
Banned socialist parties
Defunct socialist parties in Poland
Polish resistance during World War II
Polish Socialist Party
Political parties disestablished in 1947
Political parties established in 1947